Second Chance Motorsports may refer to either of two motorsports teams:
2nd Chance Motorsports
Chance 2 Motorsports